Love (German: Liebe, Italian: Uragano sul Po) is a 1956 West German-Italian drama film directed by Horst Hächler and starring Maria Schell, Raf Vallone and Eva Kotthaus. It is an adaptation of the 1951 novel Vor Rehen wird gewarnt by Vicki Baum.

The film's sets were designed by the art director Rolf Zehetbauer. It was shot at the Spandau Studios in Berlin. Location shooting took place in Venice and along the Po River.

Synopsis
Anna falls madly in love with an Italian violinist, who instead marries her sister Monika.

Cast
 Maria Schell as Anna Ballard 
 Raf Vallone as Andrea Ambaros 
 Eva Kotthaus as Monika Ballard 
 Camilla Spira as Frau Ballard 
 Fritz Tillmann as Herr Ballard 
 Peter Carsten as Jan Hopper 
 Ave Ninchi as Beatrice 
 Elke Aberle as Lorella 
 Werner Schott as Arzt 
 Wolfgang Jansen as Gärtnerjunge Kurt

References

Bibliography 
 Bock, Hans-Michael & Bergfelder, Tim. The Concise CineGraph. Encyclopedia of German Cinema. Berghahn Books, 2009.

External links 
 
 Love at Variety Distribution

1956 films
1956 romantic drama films
German romantic drama films
West German films
1950s German-language films
Italian romantic drama films
Films directed by Horst Hächler
Films based on Austrian novels
Films shot at Spandau Studios
1950s German films
1950s Italian films
German black-and-white films
Italian black-and-white films